National Public Radio broadcast a dramatization of J. R. R. Tolkien's The Lord of the Rings in 1979. It was produced by The Mind's Eye and has since been made available by several different companies.  It was produced by Bob Lewis and adapted for radio by Bernard Mayes. The most widely circulated US edition comes in a wooden box, whether on compact discs or cassette tapes.

The radio script of The Lord of the Rings was written by Bernard Mayes. It emphasized dialogue over description. The broadcasts totaled more than 11 hours. The budget was small and production time was limited. The cast were local theater players, and the production used stock music and homemade sound effects. The script of The Lord Of The Rings is notable for including the Tom Bombadil scenes, unlike most other adaptations of the book.

This production was popular at the time of its broadcast. It was later overshadowed by the BBC radio dramatization.  The Mind's Eye also produced a six-hour adaptation of The Hobbit. The Mind's Eye adaptation has also been identified with Soundelux, and, most recently, with Highbridge. The name changes correspond to the companies which owned the rights at different times.

The newer editions of the drama on compact disc and MP3 have a somewhat shorter running time than the original cassettes, omitting or condensing a considerable amount of dialogue and narration.

Cast 
 
 James Arrington - Frodo Baggins, Saruman
 Lou Bliss - Sam
 Pat Franklyn - Merry, Ioreth
 Mac McCaddon - Pippin, Galadriel
 Ray Reinhardt - Bilbo Baggins
 Bernard Mayes - Gandalf, Tom Bombadil
 Tom Luce - Strider/Aragorn, Treebeard, Denethor
 Gail Chugg - Narrator, Gimli, Gollum, Barliman Butterbur
 John Vickery - Legolas, Faramir, Wormtongue, Mouth of Sauron
 Bob Lewis - Wild Man, Glorfindel
 Erik Bauersfeld - Boromir, Theoden
 Carl Hague - Elrond, Beregond
 Matthew Locricchio - Eomer
 Karen Hurley - Eowyn

References 

Radio programmes based on Middle-earth
1970s American radio programs
American radio dramas
Fantasy radio programs
NPR programs
1979 radio dramas
Works based on The Lord of the Rings